The 1946 Polish Football Championship was the 20th edition of the Polish Football Championship and 18th completed season ended with the selection of a winner. The first season of the Polish championship after the end of World War II. Played by 18 regional champions in a cup system (qualifying round, first round and second round). The championship was decided in final tournament played among four teams. The champions were Polonia Warsaw, who won their 1st Polish title.

Main phase (central)

Qualifying round

|-

|}

First round

|-

|}

Second round

|-

|}

Final tournament table

Top goalscorers

References

Bibliography

External links
 Poland – List of final tables at RSSSF 
 List of Polish football championships 
 List of Polish football championships 

1
Polish
Polish
Seasons in Polish football competitions